Norman Tsimba Nelson (born 10 August 1983) is a South African rugby union player, currently playing with the .

Career

Mighty Elephants / Eastern Province Kings

He was named in the  wider training squad for the 2013 Super Rugby season, but was subsequently released to the Vodacom Cup squad.

Griffons

He joined Welkom-based side  in 2013. He was a key member of their 2014 Currie Cup First Division-winning side. He played in the final and score a try shortly after half-time to help the Griffons win the match 23–21 to win their first trophy for six years.

References

South African rugby union players
Eastern Province Elephants players
Living people
1983 births
South Africa international rugby sevens players